Imperial city was a medieval class of cities that were directly subject only to the Holy Roman Emperor.

Imperial City may also refer to:

 Imperial City, Beijing, a section of the city of Beijing in the Ming and Qing dynasties
 Imperial City of Huế, former capital of Vietnam
 Toledo, Spain, nicknamed "The Imperial City"
 Sarnia, also nicknamed "The Imperial City"
 Petrópolis, Brazil, also nicknamed "The Imperial City"

See also
 Imperial, California, United States, a city
 Imperial Capital (disambiguation)